Strange Ways Records is an independent record label from Hamburg, Germany.

Signed artists
Delaware
Wolfsheim

See also
 List of record labels

German record labels
German independent record labels
Indie rock record labels
Alternative rock record labels